The Hiraab Imamate also known as the Yacquubi Dynasty was a Somali kingdom that ruled parts of the Horn of Africa during the late 17th century and 19th century until it was incorporated into Italian Somaliland. The Imamate was governed by the Yacquub Dynasty. It was founded by Imam Omar who successfully rebelled and defeated the Ajuran and established an independent kingdom.

History

Establishment

The Hiraab Imamate was the successor state of the Ajuran Sultanate. The reason for their rebellion was the Ajuran rulers, in the end, became extremely prideful, neglected the sharia, and imposed a heavy taxation on their subjects which was the main reason for the rebellion.

The first clan to ever challenge the Ajuuraan rulers was the Darandoolle clan a section of Hiraab.
The Ajuuraan had decreed: “At the wells in our territory, the people known as Darandoolle and the other Hiraab cannot water their herds by day, but only at night.” … Then all the Darandoolle gathered in one place. The leaders decided to make war on the Ajuuraan. They found the imam of the Ajuuraan seated on a rock near a well called Ceel Cawl. They killed him with a sword. As they struck him with the sword, they split his body together with the rock on which he was seated. He died immediately and the Ajuuraan migrated out of the country. In another variation of the story, a young Darandoolle warrior was born with a gold ring on his finger, a sign of his future preeminence. The Darandoolle then rallied around their young leader, who eventually assumed the title of Imam of the Hiraab and took up residence in Muqdisho.

After the successful rebellion of the Darandoolle, other clans began to challenge Ajuuraan hegemony. Along the upper and middle reaches of the Shabelle valley, the pastoral Gaaljecel and Xawaadle waged several unsuccessful campaigns before they eventually united to drive the Ajuuraan out of the area. The Habar Gidir and Duduble also drove the Ajuuraan out of Galgaduud and Mudug provinces after a hard-fought battle.

By 1700, clans of Hawiye occupied a large territory stretching the interior from the Shabelle valley to the arid lands of Mudug and to the coastal areas of Mogadishu towards Hobyo. After the immediate fall of the Ajuuraan, the Hiraab established an independent rule for at least two centuries.

Called Regno di Magadozo or the Kingdom of Magadoxo in official medieval bulletins, at their peak they would go on to dominate what became Greater Benadir.

"Magadoxa extends from Cape Bassas to the equator; its limits inland have not been ascertained. The prince having succeeded in maintaining his independence, and repelled all European intercourse, allows the country to be very little unknown."

European Incursion

One of its first tests of strength was to defend Mogadishu in 1701 against a French incursion which saw seven ships dock at a nearby harbour and stayed for 11 days. They had planned to take the city but they were successfully repulsed. The quarters of Hamarweyn and Shingani united in the face of this threat. This was reported by Sharif Aydurus in his 20th-century book the Bughyat Al-Amal Fi Tarikh Al-Sumal.

In the Encyclopedia of Geography it subsequently mentions in 1707 the British ship Albemarie sent an armed boat on shore, but it was detained and never recovered. This would mark almost two centuries until Imperial forces return to East Africa.

Administration

The Ajuuraan predecessors had styled their leadership as an Imamate which was subsequently inherited by the Yacquubi family.

The Hiraab Imamate exerted a centralized authority during its existence and possessed some of the organs and trappings of a traditional integrated state: a functioning bureaucracy, a state flag, regular correspondence with neighbouring civilizations in written Arabic, taxation in the form of livestock and cash crops, as well as a professional army.

According to local oral tradition, the Hiraab imamate administration involved with a powerful alliance of closely related groups who shared a common lineage under the Hiraab clan divisions. The alliance involved the army leaders and advisors of the Habar Gidir and Duduble, the religious roles were reserved by Sheekhaal, and the Imam was reserved for the Abgaal clan who is believed to have been the firstborn. The Imamate was not only confined to Hiraab but incorporated other Somalis such as Hawadle, Gaalje'el, Murusade, Silcis, Surre and Benadiri. Once established, the Imamate ruled the territories stretching from Mogadishu in the Banaadir province to the Shabelle valley, to Galguduud province all the way to the arid lands of Mudug, which included the ancient port of Hobyo.

The Hiraab Imamate's main capital was at Mogadishu and the House of Yacquub was the ruling hereditary dynasty of the Hiraab Imamate. The Imam would receive dignitaries in Mogadishu and correspond with leaders such as the Sultan of Zanzibar or foreign explorers and assign them patrons when they visited his territory to assist them in their business and trade.

Robecchi Brichetti, an early Italian explorer who recorded many traditions of the Imamate, had made the following observation

It is a traditional custom among the Somalis, that the assumption of the title of Ugaz and Imam is always celebrated with an important ceremony attended by all the tribes with which they agree to convene. Great assemblies (scir) and fantasies take place to dance, eat, improvise songs, horse races and the party goes on for a month. In short, it is a real feast for which even when two tribes were at war, if a Somali assumes the title of Ugaz or Imam - the hostilities pursued - gain temporary peace. And it is in the solemnity of these assemblies that the head adorns themself with a special turban, made with filaments peeled from a tree which the Somalis call Ghed-hadd

Economy

Hobyo served as a prosperous commercial center for the Imamate. The agricultural centers of El Dhere and Harardhere included the production of sorghum, maize, and beans, supplementing with herds of camels, cattle, goats, and sheep. Livestock, hides, and skin, whilst the aromatic woods and raisins were the primary exports, rice, other foodstuffs, and clothes were imported. Merchants looking for exotic goods came to the Imamate ports to buy textiles, precious metals and pearls. Harvesting along the Shabelle river where major agricultural centers were located like Beledweyne and Jowhar, a large number of fruits and vegetables were produced and brought to Mogadishu and Warsheikh for trade. Also, the increasing importance and rapid settlement of more southerly cities such as Mogadishu further boosted prosperity, as more and more ships made their way down the Somali coast to trade and replenish their supplies.

The economy of the Hiraab in the interior includes nomadic pastoralism, and cultivation within agricultural settlements in the Shebelle valley and fertile plains in central Somalia, as well as mercantile commerce along the urban coast. The Hiraab ports would export various commodities through its maritime routes included cattle skin, slaves, ivory, textiles, iron, gold, silva, pearls, ambergris, incense and numerous other exotic goods.

Explorer John Kirk arrived in southern Somalia in 1873 during a period of great economic prosperity with the region being dominated by the Imamate and the Geledi Sultanate. Kirk met Imam Mahmood who reigned over Mogadishu. Trade between the Hiraab of Mogadishu and the Geledi Sultanate led by Ahmed Yusuf was flourishing. Kirk noted a variety of other things. Roughly 20 large dhows were docked in both Mogadishu and Merka respectively filled with grain produced from the farms of the Geledi in the interior with much of the trade being destined for Zanzibar.

Military

The Imamate had a regular force that acted as both law enforcement and a standing army with armament supplies from the coastal provinces. It also observed sharia law, protected the trade caravans, used a powerful mounted unit that policed the state, collected taxes or tributes of cereal and livestock. It also had a regular navy that protected its shores from piracy and the Indian Ocean trade.

With such a strong civil administration and professional army, the Imamate experienced great peace and stability with a flourishing economy.

It is known in several records that the Imamate imported firearms from Aden, Djibouti and Zanzibar to maintain armed guards in Mogadishu and to defend its country borders. It was also said to have provided the Dervishes with an array of arms from the Benadir.

Decline
By 1870, the Imamate started to decline due to internal problems which was the main reason for the complete decentralization - in a detailed event recorded by Italy, after the death of the 9th Imam Mohamed Ahmed, the succession to become the next Imam had caused a serious dispute and a near full-scale civil war. The Imam had left seven sons, which saw one of them, Ali Mohamed, usurp the remaining six and kill the senior Mahmud Mohamed in his house in the Hamaruein quarter of the city.

I figli di Ali Mohamed, Sciaeb, Abdurahman, Mahmud e Mahadalle mossero guerra contro i cugini Abdurahman, Achmed ed Ali. Rimasero morti Abdurahman e Mahmud, il quale lasciò tre figli, Hamir, Ali ed Omar. In seguito a questi eccidii il popolo Somalo si consultò seriamente per la nomina dell'Imam. Erano in antagonismo due partiti: che voleva Imam uno dei figli di Ali Mohamed, che uno dei figli di Mahmud Mohamed. La contesa fu accanita assai, tantochè per questa elezione successe una gran guerra fra le tribù, ove, dicesi, rimasero morti circa cinquecento persone d'ambo le parti.

"Ali Mohamed's sons, Sciaeb, Abdurahman, Mahmud and Mahadalle waged war against their cousins Abdurahman, Achmed, and Ali. Abdurahman and Mahmud remained dead and left behind three sons, Hamir, Ali, and Omar. Following these massacres, the Somali people seriously consulted for the appointment of the Imam. Two parties were in antagonism: those wanting as Imam the sons of Ali Mohamed, those for the sons of Mahmud Mohamed. The dispute was very fierce, so much so that for this election there was a great war between the tribes, where, it is said, about five hundred people were killed on both sides"

Si assicura, che finalmente uno della tribù degli Abgal, chiamato Omar Egalle, proponesse la pace, offrendosi di accomodare l'affare per l'elezione dell'Imam. E molto si affacendò infatti per quetare i tumultuosi partiti, non riuscendo a sedarli in parte se non con la definitiva divisizione del territorio: assegnando il tratto della costa da Ras Elhur sino a Merka sotto la protezione dei figli di Ali Mohamed, ed a principiare da Uarsciek per l'interno, sotto la protezione dei figli di Mahmud Mohamed. Questi venivano così ad occupare un territorio parallelo ai primi, ma più nell'interno.

"It was finally entrusted to the Abgal tribe, called Omar Egalle, to propose peace, offering to settle the deal for the election of the Imam. In fact, they worked hard to quell the tumultuous parties, failing to quell them in part if not within the definitive division of the territory: assigning the stretch of the coast from Ras Elhur to the environs of Merka under the protection of the sons of Ali Mohamed, and starting from Uarsciek for the interior, under the protection of the sons of Mahmud Mohamed. These thus came to occupy a territory parallel to the former, but more inland"

The Imamate also began to face challenges from increasing European design, the Sultan of Zanzibar from the coast, the Geledi Sultanate and the Hobyo Sultanate from both directions.

Since the British-sponsored bombing of Mogadishu Port in 1828 by Oman for refusing protection, the Hiraab Imamate fought for decades to maintain a sphere of influence impending the arrival of European Powers and their regional allies in Zanzibar and Egypt.

The decline of the Hiraab Imamate saw many clans begin to break off from the state leading to its fragmentation and the most prominent one being the Hawadle Sultanate ruling the Hiran region. The Hiraab Imamate was now a traditional polity that exclusively governed Mudulood territory including the capital Mogadishu.

Soon after Britain set up a colony in Aden (South Yemen) in 1839, Hobyo was targeted in British and French ambitions to control the Somali coast more directly rather than using the nominal offices of Zanzibar. They used the chief of Alula from the Bari region, Yusuf Ali Kenadid, to their advantage who, at the time of the 1884 Berlin Conference, was in conflict with his cousin-ruler over Alula, so a case was made to set up a new base in Hobyo to satisfy all the parties.

"With Britain's backing, Yusuf obtained Barghash's approval to create a new port near the mouth of the Wadi Nogal. Under pressure from Britain, Barghash agreed to acquiesce in Yusuf's proposals to establish a rival Majerteen state to the south of Cape Guardafui. Barghash, for his part, asserted that he would retain all the income and duties derived from his expanded coastline, stating that Yusuf was 'leasing' the coast to 'watch over' Zanzibari interests."

Some local oral northeastern version of the events similarly mention the aid of support from British South Yemen 

"By then, a young ambitious rebel of the Majeerteen called Yusuf Ali Kenadid managed to invade Hobyo with an army band of Hadhrami musketeers and a group of devoted lieutenants. With their assistance, he managed to overpower the local Hawiye clans and establish the Hobyo Sultanate in 1878."

An early European traveller, Elisée Reclus at the Consul in Zanzibar, describes the German political events of Hobyo - where the British first planned to govern North East Somalia from, before the Germans or the Italian offices in Zanzibar eventually entered negotiations and at the time on the disputed historical clan borders of the Hiraab Imamate and the Majerteen Sultanate and  - in several French, German and English scientific journals.

Some treaty concluded with the sultan of Opia, an obscure princelet now put forward as the "chief of all of the Somali people", his very existence is unknown to the vast majority of the nation, as is theirs to him. This village, or rather camping-ground of Opia, which has thus been suddenly promoted to the dignity of capital, is situated on a headland between the territory of the Hawiyas and that of the Mijertin tribe. But even diplomatists will never be able to make it the center of any large population, for the surrounding country is a waterless steppe, while the neighbouring seaboard is absolutely destitute of harbours

The Horn of Africa had been partitioned following the Berlin Conference in 1884 and winning through vote lobbying, Italy 
was allowed to officially acquire concessions of all the former Imamate territories of the Hawiye, administered under a Greater 'Benadir' to serve as a frontier against Ethiopian ambitions in the North East, the Ogaden and against Britain ambitions in the North West and Jubaland.

En 1908, elle réunit le protectorat du nord (Obbia, Mejertain) et le Benadir pour former la Somalie Italienne . Depuis 1889, il existe une rivalité au nord et au sud entre l'Italie et l'Ethiopie qui se discutent l'allégeance des Somalis

In 1908, it united the northern protectorate (Obbia, Mejertain) and Benadir to form Italian Somalia. Since 1889, there has been a rivalry in the north and south between Italy and Ethiopia over the allegiance of the Somalis

Robert L. Hess summarises the advent of Imperialism published in the Journal of African History.

At the end of the nineteenth century the Horn of Africa had been partitioned among Ethiopia, Great Britain, and Italy. The evacuation of the Egyptian garrison at Harrar and the military prowess of Ras Makonnen had permitted Menelik to extend his new Ethiopian empire eastwards into the Ogaden region inhabited by various Somali tribes. In 1884, the British had extended a protectorate over northwestern Somalia for the strategic defense of Aden and the Bab El Mandeb entrance to the Red Sea. In 1893, after years of difficult negotiations, an Italian chartered company had assumed its concessions of the Benadir coast of Southern Somalia, and an Italian protectorate had in anticipation been proclaimed over the rest of southern Somalia in 1889. In that year of apparent but ephemeral diplomatic success, when Italy assumed that Ethiopia, too, was its protectorate, northeastern Somalia came under influence.

An aide of the Imam who ruled the Itala-Meregh-Elhur corridor, Sultan Abiker Ali Jacub, had signed the first protectionate treaty of Italian Somaliland on 7 January 1889, attempting to achieve favourable recognition with the new Colonial Power. Italy endeavored to make Itala the first Capital of its Colony by renaming the town from its Somali name Athaleh to Itala in connotation to Italy itself following an official landing in 1891.

Sultan Abiker was killed shortly thereafter by his clan for what was deemed a betrayal of the highest order.

Questi riferiva che Abubaker, Sultano di Itala e a buon amico dell'Italia, era stato ucciso a tradimento ai primi di marzo da alcuni somali della sua stessa tribù (Abgal) a poche ore di distanza dalla stazione di Itala.

"He reported that Abubaker, Sultan of Itala and a good friend of Italy, had been killed treasonously in early March by some Somalis of his own tribe (Abgal) a few hours away from the Itala station" 

Upon receiving native concessions to rule Italian Somaliland, Italy attempted to administer the Greater Benadir Territory from Elhur on the coast of Mudug to Giumbo on the coast of Lower Jubba. This often led to border disputes over pasture, water wells and renewals of conflict. Regular attempts were made by the Colonial Administrator to draw up contractual agreements between the clans.

Tra le popolazioni che , per la loro normale dislocazione verso i limiti interni del retroterra del Benadir e dei Sultanati , erano da considerarsi « genti di confine » , andavano annoverate , oltre quelle già dette : - le tribù degli Herab, insediate nella zona a cavallo.

"Among the populations that, due to their normal location towards the boundaries of the hinterland of Benadir and the Sultanates, were to be considered "border peoples", in addition to those already mentioned: - the Herab tribes, settled in the area on Horseback"

"The Obbian was not to initiate an offensive against the Mullah without the consent of the Resident, whom he recognised as the representative of the Italian government in all matters. Obbian expansion in the direction of Meregh was halted and all armed military movements had to be approved by the Italian Resident."    

After the Fascist takeover in the 1920s, the region was snapped up by the Italians under Italian Somaliland and this eventually led to the birth of a Modern Somalia. However, the Hiraab hereditary leadership has remained intact up to this day and enjoys a dominant influence in national Somali affairs.

Rulers

See also
Ajuran Sultanate
Geledi Sultanate
History of Somalia
List of Sunni Muslim dynasties

References

Somali empires
Early Modern history of Somalia